Greenbush is an unincorporated community in Crawford County, Kansas, United States.

History
The post office was established 1874 and discontinued in 1901.

Education
The community is served by Girard USD 248 public school district.

References

Further reading

External links
 Greenbush - Education Service Center
 Pittsburg State University-Greenbush Astrophysical Observatory
 Legend of Greenbush - St. Aloysius Church, Skyways
 Crawford County maps: Current, Historic, KDOT

Unincorporated communities in Crawford County, Kansas
Unincorporated communities in Kansas